Revolution of the Mind: Live at the Apollo, Volume III is a live double album by James Brown released in 1971. As its subtitle suggests, it is Brown's third album recorded at the Apollo Theater, following the original Live at the Apollo (1963) and Live at the Apollo, Volume II (1968).
After a triple album project recorded in France was cancelled because Brown had signed with a new label, Polydor, in 1971, Brown elected to do many of the same songs on a New York project.
Unlike the cancelled live album, this was assembled from the best live takes from a week of shows, at the Apollo.
Unlike previous releases live albums, this was criticized for poor sound balance and excessive eroticism.
Note that “Escapism“/ “Make it Funky“, tracks four and five actually opened the show it was taken from.
Despite flaws, it sold well and became one of the all-time most sampled sets .

The album is notable as the first of his live albums to include a spoken introduction by his longtime master of ceremonies, Danny Ray.

Revolution of the Mind peaked at No. 39 on the pop album chart and at No. 7 on the R&B chart.

Track listing
Side A
 "It's a New Day So Let a Man Come in and Do the Popcorn" (James Brown) - 3:47
 "Bewildered" (Teddy Powell, Leonard Whitcup) - 7:55
 "Get Up (I Feel Like Being a) Sex Machine" (James Brown, Bobby Byrd, Ron Lenhoff) - 5:05

Side B
 "Escape-ism" (James Brown, David Matthews) - 3:04
 "Make It Funky" (Charles Bobbit, James Brown) - 12:52

Side C
 "Try Me" (James Brown) - 2:43 			
 Fast Medley - 1:17
"I Can't Stand It"
"Mother Popcorn"
"I Got the Feelin'" (James Brown)
 "Give It Up or Turnit a Loose" (Charles Bobbit) - 2:22
 "Super Bad" (James Brown) - 4:22
 "Get Up, Get into It, Get Involved" (James Brown, Bobby Byrd, Ron Lenhoff) - 3:23

Side D
 "Get Up, Get into It, Get Involved" (James Brown, Bobby Byrd, Ron Lenhoff) (Part 2)- 4:55
 "Soul Power" (James Brown) - 1:47
 "Hot Pants (She Got to Use What She Got to Get What She Wants)" (James Brown, Fred Wesley) - 8:35

1993 reissue
''The track listing was amended to make note of the Danny Ray intro not mentioned on the original release, and a re-edit/re-tracking of the transition between "Get Up, Get Into It, Get Involved" and "Soul Power." / Liner notes mentioned that tracks 4 and 5 were actually opening numbers for the first live show of the July, 1971 weeklong gig.

 Intro/"It's a New Day So Let a Man Come in and Do the Popcorn" (James Brown) - 3:47
 "Bewildered" (Teddy Powell, Leonard Whitcup) - 7:55
 "Get Up (I Feel Like Being a) Sex Machine" (James Brown, Bobby Byrd, Ron Lenhoff) - 5:05
 "Escape-ism" (James Brown, David Matthews) - 3:04
 "Make It Funky" (Charles Bobbit, James Brown) - 12:52
 "Try Me" (James Brown) - 2:43 			
 Fast Medley - 1:17
"I Can't Stand It"
"Mother Popcorn"
"I Got the Feelin'" (James Brown)
 "Give It Up or Turnit a Loose" (Charles Bobbit) - 2:22
 "Super Bad" (James Brown) - 4:22
 "Get Up, Get into It, Get Involved" (James Brown, Bobby Byrd, Ron Lenhoff) - 3:21
 "Soul Power" (James Brown) - 6:36
 "Hot Pants (She Got to Use What She Got to Get What She Wants) (James Brown, Fred Wesley) - 8:35

References

James Brown live albums
1971 live albums
Albums recorded at the Apollo Theater